Ethan Avram Berkowitz (born February 4, 1962) is an American attorney, businessman, and politician from Alaska. From 1997 to 2007 he was the Alaska State Representative for District 26, serving as the Democratic Party Minority Leader from 1999 to 2007. He was the Democratic nominee for lieutenant governor in 2006, for Alaska's at-large congressional district in 2008, and for governor in 2010. He was elected mayor of Anchorage in 2015, and reelected in 2018. Berkowitz resigned as mayor of Anchorage in October 2020 after admitting to being in a "consensual, inappropriate messaging relationship" with a reporter.

Early life and education
Berkowitz was born to a Jewish family in San Francisco, California. He earned a Bachelor of Arts degree in government and economics from Harvard College in 1983, a MPhil in polar studies from Cambridge University in 1986, and a Juris Doctor from the Hastings College of Law in 1990.

He moved to Alaska after graduating from law school, and has worked as an attorney and business owner.

Political career

Alaska House of Representatives

Berkowitz was the Democratic minority leader in the Alaska House of Representatives from 1999 to 2007. He was first elected to represent District 26 (Anchorage) in 1996 and reelected in 1998, 2000, 2002, and 2004.

2006 campaign

In the 2006 election Berkowitz was the Democratic nominee for lieutenant governor of Alaska, running with gubernatorial nominee Tony Knowles. Knowles and Berkowitz were defeated in the general election by Sarah Palin and Sean Parnell, 48% to 41%.

2008 campaign

In 2008 Berkowitz ran for election as U.S. Representative for Alaska's At-large congressional district, held by scandal-plagued Republican Don Young, who was seeking his 19th term in Congress. Berkowitz defeated Diane Benson in the August 26 Democratic primary by a substantial margin.

The initial results from the general election on November 4, 2008, showed Young leading the race, but with many absentee and provisional ballots left to be counted, the race was not called. On November 12 the media declared that Young had been reelected.

Berkowitz conceded defeat on November 18, after counting of absentee and provisional ballots had mostly been completed and Young had a clearly insurmountable lead. Ultimately Young received 50% of the vote to Berkowitz's 45%. Berkowitz received more votes in 2008 (142,560) than any Democrat who had ever run against Young for Congress, and came the closest any Democrat had to unseating Young since 1990, when John Devens of Valdez received 48% of the vote.

2010 campaign

In December 2008 Berkowitz said he was considering challenging Young again in 2010, but in July 2009 he said he would not run and was instead considering challenging Governor Sarah Palin. Berkowitz entered the race following Palin's resignation in July 2009 and on August 24, 2010, he defeated State Senator Hollis S. French for the Democratic nomination. Incumbent Republican Governor Sean Parnell defeated Berkowitz and his running mate Diane E. Benson in the November general election, 59% to 38%.

2015 mayoral campaign
Berkowitz ran for mayor of Anchorage in 2015. He finished ahead of the rest of the field in the nonpartisan primary on April 7, advancing to a runoff with Assemblywoman Amy Demboski. Endorsed by the third-place finisher, former Republican state representative Andrew Halcro, he won the May 5 runoff election by a 19-point margin.

Comments Berkowitz had made on the Bernadette and Berkowitz Show attracted controversy. In the context of a debate on October 13, 2014, with co-host Bernadette Wilson over same-sex marriage, Berkowitz had said, "I support the idea of adults being able to choose who they have a relationship with. Father and son should be allowed to marry, if they’re both consenting adults—if you’re defining marriage as the bundle of rights and privileges that’s now accrued to people, then yes." Berkowitz later called the remark a "hypothetical insinuation", denying that he supports incest.

Mayor of Anchorage
On July 1, 2015, Berkowitz was sworn in as Anchorage's mayor. In his inauguration speech he urged city residents and leaders to work to overcome differences and "rise above the immediacy and smallness of the moment".

On October 13, 2020, he announced that he would resign, effective October 23, after he acknowledged the previous day that he had been in a "consensual, inappropriate messaging relationship" with KYUR television anchor Maria Athens.

Other ventures
Berkowitz took the position of Senior Vice President of the Anchorage, Alaska branch of Strategies 360 in February 2011.

Berkowitz and Bernadette Wilson were co-hosts of the Bernadette and Berkowitz Show on Anchorage radio station KFQD in 2014. He left the show when he began his mayoral campaign.

Electoral history

References

External links

 Mayor's Office website
 Ethan Berkowitz for Mayor of Anchorage Official campaign website
 
 Ethan Berkowitz at 100 Years of Alaska's Legislature
 

|-

|-

|-

|-

1962 births
Living people
21st-century American politicians
Alaska lawyers
Alumni of the University of Cambridge
Candidates in the 2008 United States elections
Candidates in the 2010 United States elections
Harvard College alumni
Jewish American state legislators in Alaska
Jewish mayors of places in the United States
Lawyers from San Francisco
Mayors of Anchorage, Alaska
Democratic Party members of the Alaska House of Representatives
Politicians from San Francisco
Radio personalities from Alaska
University of California, Hastings College of the Law alumni
21st-century American Jews